The Best Of is a greatest hits album by German DJ Sash!. It was released by Hard2Beat on 20 October 2008. It's a double album, including all of Sash!'s celebrated hits (on the first disc) and 12 remixes from four different songs (on the second disc).

Track listing

Disc one
 Encore Une Fois (Blunt Radio Edit) featuring Sabine Ohmes from It's My Life – The Album
 Ecuador featuring Adrian Rodriguez from It's My Life – The Album
 Stay featuring La Trec from It's My Life – The Album
 La Primavera featuring Patrizia Salvatore from Life Goes On
 Mysterious Times featuring Tina Cousins* from Life Goes On
 Move Mania featuring Shannon from Life Goes On
 Colour the World featuring Dr. Alban & Inka Auhagen from Life Goes On
 Adelante featuring Adrian Rodriguez and Peter Faulhammer from Trilenium
 Just Around the Hill (Dance Radio Edit) featuring Tina Cousins* from Trilenium
 With My Own Eyes featuring Inka Auhagen from Trilenium
 Ganbareh featuring Mikio from S4!Sash!
 Run featuring Boy George from S4!Sash!
 I Believe featuring TJ Davis from S4!Sash!
 It's My Life (The Very First Single) from It's My Life – The Album
 Raindrops (Encore Une Fois) (Kindervater Edit) featuring Stunt
 Raindrops (Encore Une Fois) (Fonzerelli Re-Work) featuring Stunt
 Just Around the Hill featuring Tina Cousins from Trilenium

Disc two
 Ecuador (Javi Mula & Joan Reyes Remix)
 Ecuador (Will Bailey & Calvertron Remix)
 Ecuador (Bad Behaviour Remix)
 Stay (Cedric Gervais Vocal Remix)
 Stay (Fonzerelli Re-Work)
 Stay (Bass Slammers Remix)
 La Primavera (Static Shokx Remix)
 La Primavera (Twocker's Popcorn Remix)
 La Primavera (3Style Remix)
 Mysterious Times (7th Heaven Remix)
 Mysterious Times (Spencer & Hill Remix)
 Mysterious Times (Sound Selektaz Club Mix)

 This is a slightly different edit of the song.

Personnel
SASH! – producer
Tokapi – producer
Written by: Ralf Kappmeier, Thomas Alisson, Sascha Lappessen
Features/Vocals by: Sabine Ohmes, Rodriguez, La Trec, Patrizia, Tina Cousins, Shannon, Dr. Alban, Inka, Peter Faulhammer, Boy George, T.J. Davis, Sarah Brightman, Stunt
Remixes by: Kindevater, Fonzerelli, Javi Mula, Joan Reyes, Will Bailey, Calvertron, Bad Behaviour, Cedric Gervais, Bass Clammers, Static Shokx, Twocker, 3 Style, 7th Heaven, Spencer & Hill, Sound Selekataz

Chart performance
The album reached No. 39 in the top 40 of the UK Albums chart in 2008.
300,000 copies sold in less than three months in the UK and achieved platinum status.

Notes
There is also an Extended Edition of the album, containing extended versions of the first 13 tracks of the first disc. This edition was only available from the iTunes Store.

References

Sash! compilation albums
2008 greatest hits albums
Dance Nation (record label) compilation albums